British Lion are an English hard rock band formed by Steve Harris, best known as the bassist for Iron Maiden.

History 
Steve Harris formed the band to play in small venues, as opposed to the large arenas typically played by Iron Maiden, and as an outlet for shorter hard rock-oriented songs in which he can experiment with different bass guitar styles. The band also includes singer Richard Taylor, guitarists David Hawkins and Grahame Leslie, and drummer Simon Dawson.

Harris had first met Leslie in the early 1990s after Leslie sent him a demo tape, and Harris mentored the careers of Leslie and Taylor for several years until deciding to include them in the British Lion project. The band's tours are typically scheduled after the conclusion of Iron Maiden tours, when Harris becomes interested in playing in clubs and theaters as he did in Iron Maiden's early years.

The album British Lion, released in 2012, was marketed as a solo album by Harris with the other musicians described as his backing band. The project was then re-positioned as a self-contained band with most songs written by Harris, Taylor, and Hawkins. Their second album The Burning was released in January 2020.
The album was voted Album of the Year by Paul Stenning for BraveWords.

Personnel 
Steve Harris – bass guitar, keyboards
Richard Taylor – lead vocals       
David Hawkins – guitar, keyboards
Grahame Leslie – guitar
Simon Dawson – drums

Discography 
 British Lion (2012)
 The Burning (2020)

References  

English hard rock musical groups
2012 establishments in England
Musical groups established in 2012